Wadi Ahwar is a major wadi of southern Yemen.
Wadis of Yemen

References